Shimsha is a river that flows in the state of Karnataka, India. It is one of the tributaries of the river Kaveri, which is one of the major rivers of South India.

Geography
Origin
Shimsha originates at an altitude of 914 m in the Devarayanadurga hill located in Tumakuru Taluk  which is also the location of two temples of the Hindu God, Narasimha.

Course
After originating in the  Tumkur district, The Markonahalli Dam has been built across it, the river takes a southerly course and enters the Mandya district. In Mandya district, the river flows in a south-eastern direction and has a waterfall at Shimshapura in Malavalli Taluk. Just after Shimshapura it reaches the border of Chamarajanagar district where it joins the river Kaveri. The confluence of Shimsha and Kaveri is also near the Shivanasamudra falls.

Sub-tributaries
In its course the river is joined by other smaller rivers and streams such as Veeravaishnavi, Kanihalla, Chikkahole, Hebbahalla, Mullahalla and Kanva.

Towns and cities
Maddur is a major town that lies on this river.

Dams
Markonahalli Dam

Markonahalli Dam is a dam built across the river Shimsha in the Kunigal Taluk of Tumkur district. It was built by Krishnaraja Wodeyar IV, the king of Mysore under the guidance of his Diwan, Sir M Visweswaraiah. It was built to irrigate 6070 hectares of land and has a masonry structure of 139 m and a pair of earth dams extending to 1470 metres on either side. Cirrhinus reba and Labeo calbasu and other transplanted carps are also found here. However, the maintenance of the dam has been poor. In 2000, a part of the dam had to be demolished to prevent floods and save 25 villages. Water started overflowing the dam and only 1 crest gate could be opened. Nearly 150 feet of the dam was demolished to allow excess water to flow out.

Power generation
Shimsha has a waterfall at Shimshapura in Malavalli Taluk. This is also the location of the Shimsha Hydro Electric Project which has an installed capacity of 17,200 kilowatts. 
It was the first ever hydro electric project in Asia. Kolar Gold Fields was supplied with the electricity generated in 1902.
Three years later Bangalore was electrified. The foundation stone for this project was laid by Krishnaraja Wodeyar IV, the king of Mysore.

Issues

Sand mining
The sand found on the river bed of the Shimsha river is mined and used for construction activities, sometimes illegally. Due to the environmental issues that can be caused by sand mining, this activity is currently banned.

Pollution
Discharge of waste from towns and cities on the way are major contributors to pollution in the Shimsha. However, the Government is trying to clean up the river and has released funds for the same.

See also
 Pharping Hydro Power Project

Accidents 

In 1897, a railway bridge over this river collapsed during a heavy flood, killing about 150 passengers.

References 

Rivers of Karnataka
Geography of Tumkur district
Tributaries of the Kaveri River
Rivers of India